Burgfestspiele Bad Vilbel is a theatre festival in Bad Vilbel Germany. The Burgfestspiele Bad Vilbel founded in 1987 performing from June to September in the historic scenery of the water castle Bad Vilbel. Beside own theatre productions, musicals, an own child program and smaller theatre productions in the cellar, the program of the open air theater is completed by guest performances.

Open air theater location 
The Burgfestspiele perform in the remains of an old water castle from the 12th century, located north in the spa gardens of Bad Vilbel. Knight of Bad Vilbel where living here, from 1581 to 1796 it was the official residence of the Kurmainz administration. Remarkable is the surrounding moat, the gate with hatchment, the baroque well in the courtyard and the large deep cellar. In the festival season from June to September the large stage and a canopied grandstand with about 700 seats are assembled. With a number of visitors exceeding 100,000 in 2015, the Burgfestspiele Bad Vilbel belongs to the top open air theatre festival locations in Germany.

List of productions for 2019 
 Aschenputtel (Opera for all from age of 5, according Gioacchino Rossini), 
 1984 (by George Orwell, version by Alan Lyddiard, German translation Michael Raab),
 Frau Müller muss weg (by Lutz Hübner and Sarah Nemitz),
 Pippi auf den sieben Meeren (Play for visitors from age of 5, according Astrid Lindgren),
 Emil und die Detektive (Musical for all from age of 5, according Erich Kästner),
 Pension Schöller (Droll story from Wilhelm Jacoby and Carl Laufs, version Jürgen Wölffer,
 Saturday Night Fever (Musical from Robert Stigwood and Bill Oakes, version Ryan McBryde, music The Bee Gees, German dialogs Anja Hauptmann,
 Shakespeare In Love (according to the script from Marc Norman and Tom Stoppard, stage adaption Lee Hall, music PaddyCunneen, German by Corinna Brocher,
 Der dressierte Mann (Comedy by John von Düffel according Esther Vilar)

References

Theatre festivals in Germany